Dikson Island, initially Dickson, is the name of an island in Taymyrsky Dolgano-Nenetsky District, Krasnoyarsk Krai, Russia, situated in the Kara Sea near the mouth of the Yenisei River. A nearby urban-type settlement of Dikson, which functions as a port and hydrometeorological centre, is located on the mainland across from the island. It is served by the Dikson Airport.

History

Dikson Island and its adjoining urban settlement have been named after Swedish Arctic pioneer Baron Oscar Dickson. In 1875, the Finnish explorer Adolf Erik Nordenskiöld renamed it after the wealthy Swedish merchant and philanthropist of Scottish origin Oskar Dickson. The name was soon Russified, by dropping the "c". Dikson has been the official name of the island since 1884. Oscar Dickson, along with Aleksandr Mikhaylovich Sibiryakov, had been the patron of a number of early Arctic expeditions, including Adolf Erik Nordenskiöld's Russian Arctic explorations.

In 1915 the island became the site of the first Russian radio station in the Arctic. The seaport on the mainland was built in 1935, and in 1957 the two settlements were merged into one.

Dikson Island was one of the transfer destinations for 1949 March deportation from Latvia.

Climate
Dikson has a severe Arctic tundra climate (Köppen climate classification ET). The weather (even in the warmest month, August) is notoriously unpleasant. Winter in Dikson lasts ten months, and for two of those months the sun never rises.

See also
 List of islands of Russia

References

External sources
 Location 
 Edwards, Rob (September 9, 1995). Northern exposure. New Scientist. 
 William Barr, The Last Journey of Peter Tessem and Paul Knutsen, 1919.
 Picture
 Russian-Soviet polar stations and their role in the Arctic Seas exploration

Port cities and towns in Russia
Islands of the Kara Sea
Populated places of Arctic Russia
Islands of Krasnoyarsk Krai